In architecture and the decorative arts, a rinceau (plural rinceaux; from the French, derived from old French rain 'branch with foliage') is a decorative form consisting of a continuous wavy stemlike motif from which smaller leafy stems or groups of leaves branch out at more or less regular intervals. The English term scroll is more often used in English, especially when the pattern is regular, repeating along a narrow zone.  In English "rinceau" tends to be used where the design spreads across a wider zone, in a similar style to an Islamic arabesque pattern. 

The use of rinceaux is frequent in the friezes of Roman buildings, where it is generally found in a frieze, the middle element of an entablature, just below the cornice. It is also decorated in the jamb ornaments and capitals of Romanesque structures and in friezes and panels of buildings in the various Renaissance styles, where tiny animals or human heads also appear.

The rinceau experienced a return to the simpler Classic style in the 17th century, and in the subsequent century it was applied more freely, without a strict repetition of identical forms.

Gallery

Notes

See also
 Margent
 Scroll
 Scrollwork
 Volute
 Acanthus (ornament)

External links
 Decorating with Art, Antiques and Collectibles 
 Home Economics Archive: Tradition, Research, History (HEARTH) An e-book collection of over 1,000 books on home economics spanning 1850 to 1950, created by Cornell University's Mann Library. Includes several hundred e-books on decorative art and design, particularly that created within the home.
 Victoria and Albert Museum
 The Bard Graduate Center (BGC) for Studies in the Decorative Arts, Design and Culture
 Parsons/Cooper-Hewitt Program in the History of Decorative Arts & Design
 Digital Library for the Decorative Arts and Material Culture - electronic resources
 Metropolitan Museum of Art American decorative arts collection
 National Gallery of Art decorative arts collection

Ornaments (architecture)